Tikwapur is an Indian village in Ghatampur tehsil of Kanpur district, Uttar Pradesh. It is also known by the name of Trivikrampur. Its corrupted name is Tikmapur.

Geographical situation
It is situated in tehsil Ghatampur, district Kanpur of state Uttar Pradesh, India, on left bank of River Yamuna. Tikmapur village is 58 km from Kanpur and 2 km from Kanpur-Sagar National High Way towards west.

Famous persons

Kavi Bhushan, India's first national poet

Historical Importance
Ratnakar Tripathi's family in the 17th century lived in this village. Three sons of Ratnakar Tripathi were famous for his poetry in medieval India:
Kavi Bhushan
Kavi Chintamani
Matiram

References

Villages in Kanpur Nagar district